The State Committee of Television and Radio Broadcasting of the Soviet Union (Russian: Государственный комитет СССР по телевидению и радиовещанию) commonly  known as Gosteleradio of the USSR (Гостелерадио СССР) was the main state body of that supervised over all television and radio broadcasting of the Soviet Union from September 10, 1931 to December 27, 1991.

History 
On September 10, 1931, the All-Union Committee on Radio Broadcasting was created under the People's Commissariat of Posts and Telegraphs of the USSR and changed names and functions multiple times. Two years later on January 31, 1933, it was liquidated, and on its basis the All-Union Committee for Radioification and Radio Broadcasting was created under the Council of People's Commissars of the USSR. In 1949 it was liquidated, and on its basis the Radio Information Committee was created under the Council of Ministers of the USSR, which led the Central Intra-Union Radio Broadcasting, and the Radio Broadcasting Committee under the Council of Ministers of the USSR, which directed the Central Radio Broadcasting to foreign countries, in 1953 they were also liquidated, and on their basis the Main Directorate of Radio Information of the Ministry of Culture of the USSR and the Main Directorate of Radio Information of the Ministry of Culture of the USSR were created.

On May 16, 1957, the Main Directorate of Radio Information of the Ministry of Culture of the USSR was liquidated, and on its basis the State Committee on Radio Broadcasting and Television was created under the Council of Ministers of the USSR (the Main Directorate of Radio Broadcasting was subordinated to it on May 28, 1959, and from 1957 to 1959 it operated under the State Committee for Cultural Relations with Foreign Countries ), repeatedly renamed:
 From April 24, 1962 – the State Committee of the Council of Ministers of the USSR on Radio Broadcasting and Television 
 From December 9, 1965 – the Committee on Radio and Television under the Council of Ministers of the USSR.
 From July 15, 1970 — the State Committee of the Council of Ministers of the USSR on Television and Radio Broadcasting
 From July 5, 1978 – the State Committee of the USSR on Television and Radio Broadcasting.

Throughout the existence of the committee, the release of television and radio broadcasts was carried out by the subdivisions of the committee (program directorates of Central Television and All-Union Radio), almost all television broadcasts were prepared by the subordinate organizations of the committee acting as subdivisions (thematic main editions of Central Television), only feature films were produced by film studios on request of the committee, most of the documentary television films were produced by the Ekran creative association subordinate to the committee, some by the subdivisions of the local committees on television and radio broadcasting. It was only in the fall of 1990 that some of the TV programs commissioned by the committee began to be prepared by the first private television organizations VID Television Company and Author's Television.

On February 8, 1991, the All-Union State Television and Radio Broadcasting Company was created, to which all the property of the committee was transferred, the committee itself was abolished somewhat later, and on April 11, the company was declared its legal successor.

Chairmen 
Gosteleradio of the USSR was headed by the chairman appointed by the Supreme Soviet of the Soviet Union:

 1931–1933: Feliks Kon
 1933–1936: Platon Kerzhentsev
 1936–1939: Konstantin Maltsev
 1939–1941: G. I. Stukov
 1941–1944: D. A. Polikarpov
 1944–1949, 1953: A. A. Puzin (radio information)
 1950–1953: S. A. Vinogradov (radio broadcasting)
 1957–1959: Dmitry Chesnokov
 1959–1962: Sergei Kaftanov
 1962–1964: M. A. Kharlamov
 1964–1970: N. N. Mesyatsev
 1970–1985: Sergey Lapin
 1985–1989: A. N. Aksyonov
 1989–1990: M.F. Nenashev
 November 14, 1990 – February 8, 1991: L. P. Kravchenko

See also 
 Radio in the Soviet Union
 Television in the Soviet Union

References 

State Committees of the Soviet Union
1991 disestablishments in the Soviet Union
1931 establishments in the Soviet Union
Television in the Soviet Union
Radio in the Soviet Union